Iphinopsis choshiensis is a species of sea snail, a marine gastropod mollusk in the family Cancellariidae, the nutmeg snails.

Description
The shell size varies between 3 mm and 5 mm.

Distribution
This species occurs in the seas off Japan.

References

Cancellariidae
Gastropods described in 1958